Ouled Hellal is a town and commune in Médéa Province, Algeria. During the 1998 census, it had a population of 3062.

References

Communes of Médéa Province
Cities in Algeria
Algeria